Oscar Sabo (29 August 1881, in Vienna – 2 May 1969, in Berlin) was an Austrian actor.

Selected filmography
 Jettatore (1919)
 The False Dimitri (1922)
 Storm in a Water Glass (1931)
 The Little Escapade (1931)
 The Spanish Fly (1931)
 A Night in Paradise (1932)
 Gitta Discovers Her Heart (1932)
 Things Are Getting Better Already (1932)
 Wedding at Lake Wolfgang (1933)
 The Marathon Runner (1933)
 Girls of Today (1933)
 Love Must Be Understood (1933)
 Tales from the Vienna Woods (1934)
 Fresh Wind from Canada (1935)
 Last Stop (1935)
 The Court Concert (1936)
 The Divine Jetta (1937)
 Steputat & Co. (1938)
The Secret Lie (1938)
 The Deruga Case (1938)
 Heimatland (1939)
 Detours to Happiness (1939)
  Twelve Minutes After Midnight (1939)
 Left of the Isar, Right of the Spree (1940)
 The Girl at the Reception (1940)
 Counterfeiters (1940)
 The Gasman (1941)
 Above All Else in the World (1941)
 The Buchholz Family (1944)
 Marriage of Affection (1944)
 Viennese Girls (1945)
 An Everyday Story (1948)
  When Men Cheat (1950)
 Three Girls Spinning (1950)
 Lady's Choice (1953)
 The Silent Angel (1954)
 The Three from the Filling Station (1955)
 Two Among Millions (1961)

Bibliography
 Bergfelder, Tim & Bock, Hans-Michael. ''The Concise Cinegraph: Encyclopedia of German. Berghahn Books, 2009.

External links

1881 births
1969 deaths
Austrian male film actors
Austrian male silent film actors
Male actors from Vienna
20th-century Austrian male actors